Beath is a surname. Notable people with the surname include:

Barry Beath (born 1944), Australian rugby league player
Betty Beath (born 1932), Australian composer, pianist and music educator
Chris Beath (born 1984), Australian soccer referee
Cynthia Beath (born 1944), American computer scientist
Danny Beath (1960–2013), British photographer and botanist
Kate Beath (1882–1979), New Zealand architect
Robert Burns Beath (1839–1914), American military officer